The Metcalfe County Kentucky Courthouse, on Public Square in Edmonton, Kentucky, was built in 1868–69.  It was listed on the National Register of Historic Places in 2000.

The courthouse is a two-story common bond brick structure, Italianate in style.  It was deemed significant as "one of the oldest courthouses still standing in south central Kentucky since many have been torn down and replaced by new structures. It is the unofficial symbol or logo for Metcalfe County - the one thing all Metcalfe Countians can identify with and recognize."

References

Courthouses on the National Register of Historic Places in Kentucky
Italianate architecture in Kentucky
Government buildings completed in 1869
National Register of Historic Places in Metcalfe County, Kentucky
County courthouses in Kentucky
1869 establishments in Kentucky
Edmonton, Kentucky